A list of Pembroke College, Oxford people including former students, fellows, honorary fellows, principals and masters of Pembroke College, University of Oxford, England and its predecessor Broadgates Hall. The overwhelming maleness of this list can be partially explained by the fact that for over three centuries (from its foundation in 1624 until 1979), women were barred from studying at Pembroke.

Former students

 Abdullah II of Jordan, current ruler of Jordan
 William Adams, religious writer and essayist
 Patience Agbabi, performance poet
 Hilarion Alfeyev, Metropolitan of the Russian Orthodox Church, theologian, composer
 Francis Beaumont, playwright
 Michael Bettaney, a former MI5 intelligence officer convicted of Official Secrets Act offences in 1984
 Tanya Beckett, journalist and TV presenter
 Sir William Blackstone, jurist
 Edmund Bonner, bishop, known as 'Bloody Bonner'
 Kevin Brennan, Labour politician, MP for Cardiff West
 Sir Thomas Browne, seventeenth-century author
Ian Burnett, Baron Burnett of Maldon, Lord Chief Justice of England and Wales
 Pete Buttigieg, Mayor of South Bend, Indiana and 2020 Democratic presidential candidate
 William Camden, antiquarian and historian
 John Charmley, Professor of Modern History at the University of East Anglia
 Oz Clarke, oenophile and broadcaster
 Ed Conway, the first Economics Editor of Sky News (since 2011)
 Richard Corbet, Bishop of Oxford and Norwich, was a student resident in Broadgates Hall before it became Pembroke College
 Benjamin Cox, English Baptist minister, student resident in Broadgates Hall before it became Pembroke College
 David Cracknell, former Sunday Times Political Editor
 Mary Creagh, Labour politician
 Thomas Percival Creed, Principal Queen Mary, University of London; Vice-Chancellor University of London
 Julian Critchley, journalist and Conservative politician
 Caryn Davies Rowing, World Championships, Olympic Games Gold medal
 Denzil Davies, Labour politician
 Maria Eagle, Labour government minister
 Alun Evans, Co-founder of BUSA and Chief Executive Officer of Football Association of Wales
 J. William Fulbright, Democratic U.S. Senator representing Arkansas
 Stefan Gates, food & cookery writer and television presenter
 Hannes Hólmsteinn Gissurarson, Icelandic political philosopher and writer
 David Allen Green, lawyer and legal writer
 Tim Griffin, Republican Member of Congress representing Arkansas
 John Hattendorf, maritime historian
 Charles Hawtrey (19th century actor)
 George Procter Hawtrey, actor and playwright
 Michael Heseltine, former Conservative Deputy Prime Minister and publisher
Tom Hunt, serving Member of Parliament for Ipswich
 Walter Isaacson, author and President and CEO of the Aspen Institute
 Samuel Johnson, lexicographer, biographer, writer, poet 
 John Jordan, poet, writer, literary critic, editor, academic and broadcaster
 Roz Kaveney, writer
 Charles Kempe, Victorian stained glass designer
 John Kerr, Baron Kerr of Kinlochard, diplomat
 Sir Louis Addin Kershaw, judge
 Philip Lader, former American ambassador to the United Kingdom, businessman
 Richard G. Lugar, American Republican Senator
 Stephen McKay, academic
 Bernard Miles, Lord Miles, actor
 Sir John Mummery, Lord Justice of Appeal
 Viktor Orbán, Prime Minister of Hungary (1998-2002, 2010-)
 Tarik O'Regan, composer
 Sukhumbhand Paribatra, 15th Governor of Bangkok, Thailand
 John Pym, parliamentarian and critic of Charles I of England
 Geoffrey Raisman, neuroscientist
 Peter Ricketts, Baron Ricketts, diplomat
 Paul Addison, academic historian of WW2 Britain and its social implications
 Roland Ritchie, former justice of the Supreme Court of Canada
 Win Rockefeller, American philanthropist, Lieutenant Governor of Arkansas
 Chris Rokos, hedge fund manager
 Sir John Scott, Deputy Judge Advocate-General in Egypt, Judicial Advisor to the Khedive, 1891–98
 William Shenstone, 18th Century poet
 Radosław Sikorski, Polish politician and former Minister of Foreign Affairs
 James Smithson, mineralogist, benefactor of the Smithsonian Institution
 John Snagge, BBC newsreader and commentator
 The Rt Rev. Thomas Stanage, Anglican Bishop in South Africa
 Samuel John Stone, Anglican clergyman and hymnwriter (The Church's One Foundation)
 Katharine Viner, editor-in-chief of The Guardian from summer 2015
 Honeysuckle Weeks, actress
 George Whitefield, leader of the Methodist movement in the eighteenth century.
 John Orman Gilbert, resident minister to Brunei

Fellows

 Gerald Allen, bishop, Fellow, Dean, and Chaplain of Pembroke College (1910–20), made an Honorary Fellow in 1934
 Antony Andrewes, historian, Fellow (1933–46)
 Robert Baldick, scholar of French literature
 Simon Blackburn, philosopher, former Fellow
 The Rt Rev. Brian Burrowes, bishop, Fellow, Lecturer, Dean and Chaplain until 1937
 John Cameron, Lord Abernethy, Scottish lawyer, Honorary Fellow
 Henry William Chandler, classical scholar, elected Fellow in 1853
 R. G. Collingwood, philosopher and historian.
 David Eastwood, academic, Vice-Chancellor of the University of Birmingham since 13 April 2009, former fellow
 John Eekelaar, law lecturer, academic director of Pembroke College (2005–2009)
 Charles Harding Firth, historian, Fellow in 1887
 Malcolm Reginald Godden, Junior Research Fellow (1969–1972), Rawlinson and Bosworth Professor of Anglo-Saxon in the University of Oxford since May 1991.
 Richard Graves, minister and poet
 Conyngham Greene, diplomat, Honorary Fellow 1917
 Henrietta Harrison, historian and sinologist, Fellow 2015
 Martha Klein, philosopher, retired in 2006
 John Krebs, Baron Krebs, zoologist, current Principal of Jesus College, Oxford
 Robert Macintosh, New Zealand-born anaesthetist, Honorary Fellow 1965
 Kenneth Mackenzie, Bishop of Brechin (1935–1943), Fellow, Dean and Chaplain (1905–1910)
 Piers Mackesy, military historian, tutor in modern history and Fellow (1954–88)
 Christopher Melchert, American scholar of Islam, Fellow in Arabic
 Edward Moore, canon of Canterbury Cathedral, Honorary Fellow of Pembroke and Queen's colleges 
 Robert Payne, cleric, natural philosopher, second Fellow of the college in 1624
 Zbigniew Pełczyński, politics scholar, emeritus fellow
 Thomas Risley, Presbyterian minister 
 George Rolleston, physician and zoologist, Fellow 1851
 Colin Sheppard, engineer, Fellow (1979–89)
 Helen Small, Professor of English Literature
 Eric Stanley, scholar of Medieval literature, Rawlinson and Bosworth Professor of Anglo-Saxon and Fellow of Pembroke College, Oxford (1977–91)
 William Thomas,  Welsh clergyman and academic, Fellow after 1760
 J. R. R. Tolkien, a Fellow from 1925 to 1945 and wrote The Hobbit and the first two books of The Lord of the Rings during his time there.
 Stephen Tuck, historian
 Christopher M. Tuckett, biblical scholar, Professor of New Testament Studies and Fellow
 Metropolitan Kallistos Ware, English bishop in the Eastern Orthodox church, theologian, Fellow (1970–2001)
 Robin Wilson, mathematician, Stipendiary Lecturer at Pembroke
 Michael Winterbottom, Classics Professor
 Charles Leslie Wrenn, Rawlinson and Bosworth Professor of Anglo-Saxon (1945–63), member of the "Inklings"

Masters
Source:
 1526 Richard Arche
 1549–53 Thomas Randolph, ambassador of Elizabeth I, Principal of Broadgates Hall, which is now Pembroke College
 1624–47 Thomas Clayton, the last Principal of Broadgates Hall and became the first Master of Pembroke College
 1647 Henry Wightwick, when Clayton died the Fellows elected Wightwick as Master
 1647–60 Henry Langley, however the Parliamentary Committee for the University elected Langley
 1660–64 Henry Wightwick, restored as Master
 1664–1709 John Hall
 1710–14 Colwell Brickenden
 1714–38 Matthew Panting, contributed to the building of the Chapel
 1738–75 John Ratcliffe
 1775–89 William Adams
 1789–96 William Sergrove, a descendant of Thomas Tesdale's (whose gift made Pembroke's existence possible). Died aged only 49.
 1796–1809 John Smyth, one-time naval chaplain, his stories earned him the nickname 'Sinbad the Sailor'. 
 1809–43 George William Hall, academic administrator
 1844–64 Francis Jeune, clergyman, Dean of Jersey (1838–1844)
 1864–91 Evan Evans, Philipps Fellow of Pembroke College (1843–1864), serving as Tutor and senior Dean, Vice-Chancellor of Oxford University (1878–1882)
 1892–98 Bartholomew Price, mathematician, became fellow in 1844 and tutor and mathematical lecturer in 1845, one of the teachers of Lewis Carroll
 1899–1918 John Mitchinson, President of the Union, teacher and Anglican priest
 1918–55 Frederick Homes Dudden, theological scholar, Chaplain to King George V and George VI (1929–52), Vice-Chancellor of Oxford University (1929–32)
 1955–68 Ronald McCallum, Fellow in history in 1925 
 1968–75 George Pickering, had held the Regius Chair of Medicine
 1975–85 Geoffrey Arthur, diplomat
 1985–93 Roger Bannister, medic, best known as the first man to run the mile in under four minutes.
 1993–2001 Robert Stevens, lawyer, previously Professor of Law at Yale, President of Haverford College, Chancellor of the University of California at Santa Cruz
 July 2001 – July 2013 Giles Henderson CBE, Senior Partner at law firm Slaughter and May
 August 2013 – June 2020 Lynne Brindley, former Chief Executive of the British Library, the United Kingdom's national library (July 2000-July 2012)
 July 2020 – present Ernest Ryder, a former Lord Justice of Appeal

References

Pembroke
People associated with Pembroke College, Oxford